Omar B. Bunnell (February 19, 1912 – October 21, 1992) was an American politician and businessman.

Bunnell was born in Castle Dale, Utah. He went to Carbon High School  and the University of Utah. He was involved in the mobile house and banking business in Price, Utah and Moab, Utah. He served in the Utah Senate from 1967 to 1992 and was a Democrat. Bunnell died in Price, Utah.

Notes

1912 births
1992 deaths
People from Emery County, Utah
University of Utah alumni
Businesspeople from Utah
Democratic Party Utah state senators
People from Price, Utah
People from Moab, Utah
20th-century American politicians
20th-century American businesspeople